Cittadini is a surname. Notable people with the surname include:

 Léo Cittadini (born 1994), Brazilian footballer
 Lorenzo Cittadini (born 1982), Italian rugby player
 Pierfrancesco Cittadini (1616–1681), Italian baroque period painter
 David Cittadini, New Zealander technical innovator